Kamal Gupta is an Indian politician. He was elected to the Haryana Legislative Assembly from Hisar in the 2014 and 2019 Haryana Legislative Assembly election as a member of the Bharatiya Janata Party.

References 

Living people
Bharatiya Janata Party politicians from Haryana
People from Hisar (city)
Haryana MLAs 2019–2024
Haryana MLAs 2014–2019
1952 births